Star Academy is the edition of the international television format Star Academy in the Republic of Georgia. It aired on Rustavi 2. Its main sponsor was MagtiCom.

Star Academy is a competition where 14 young singers endeavor to reach their goal of a career as a singer. The participants participate in a weekly show. The best from the best are chosen in the Academy during 12 weeks. The project ends with a final show which reveals the winner.

The Star Academy is a format with a reality show and a concert show in which 12 participants live in a flat located at the territory of the Star Academy. They work and rehearse in the nearby studios. Every day except Sundays  35/40 minute reality episode airs prepared showing the professional and private lives of the Star Academy participants.

The concert show, duration 90 minutes, is aired live. The participants sing the song they have prepared and the jury chooses four candidates to be eliminated. One of them can be saved by the producer group, the other by the participants. The third one is saved by the audience which votes for its favorites during the week (sending SMS and calling).

Season 1 
Season 1 of the Georgian Star Academy had high ratings on Georgian television.

Season 2 
The second season debuted Monday, March 9, 2009. The Star Academy building collapsed on April 26, 2009, in Sandro Euli Street, Tbilisi, and several people, including crew members and journalists, were hospitalized; two others were killed. Therefore, the show was cancelled.

Scores 

 Best of the night
 Nominated by the jury

Nominations table 

* No eviction was held, as the series was abandoned out of respect to those killed in the collapse of the Star Academy building April 26, 2009.

References

Star Academy
Georgia (country) television series
2000s Georgia (country) television series
2008 Georgia (country) television series debuts
2009 Georgia (country) television series endings
Rustavi 2 original programming